Pretty Princess is a 1993 Italian romantic comedy film directed by Carlo Vanzina.

Plot
Liechtenhaus (a fictional tiny European principality) is ruled by Prince Max, but the little country is nearly bankrupt. In fact, if he can't get an infusion of cash quickly, he may have to sell the royal palace to American developers as a casino complex. Fortunately, he's got a very pretty daughter, Princess Sofia and the dowry he will get from marrying her off to the unappealing, but wealthy heir to a similar nearby principality will more than get his tiny country in the clear. Unfortunately for him, his daughter is adamant about refusing this arranged marriage and prefers romance with a handsome but penniless windsurfing instructor to saving her country. Nefarious schemes are called for and when the Princess is kidnapped, something must be done.

Production 
As with other Vanzina films, there is also a longer television version, first broadcast on 6 January 1998 at 8:45pm on Italia 1. Among the additional scenes: a dialogue between the protagonist and her nanny and the night-time encounter with the ecologist kids on the beach, played by Chiara Sani and Jimmy Ghione, and a scene in which Countess von Dix reveals her betrayal to her brother, Prince Maximilian. The latter version is available on DVD distributed by Medusa in 2010 and by Mustang Entertainment in 2013.

Cast
 Barbara Snellenburg as Princess Sofia
 Raoul Bova as Marco
 David Warner as Prince Max
 Susannah York as Queen Christina
 Paul Freeman as Count Otto Von Dix
 Catherine Schell as Countess Von Dix
 Liz Smith as Queen Mother
 Jessica Simpson as Princess Astrid
 Marc Sinden as Captain Benadotti
 Alessio Avenali as Rafael Botero
 Bettina Giovannini as Olivia
 Francesca Ventura as Rita
 Godfrey James as Franz
 Adam Barker as Prince Frederick
 Julian Rhind-Tutt		
 Sarah Alexander as Ursula
 Virginie Marsan as Laura
 Tilly Blackwood as Princess
 Shane Rimmer as Mr. Hughes

See also      
 List of Italian films of 1993

References

External links
 
 

1993 films
1990s Italian-language films
Films directed by Carlo Vanzina
Films set in Sardinia
1993 romantic comedy films
Films about royalty
Films set in Europe
Films set in a fictional country
Italian romantic comedy films